My Story is the debut solo album by former lead singer of Swedish pop band Ace of Base, Jenny Berggren.

Background
The track listing was revealed on Jenny's official website on 30 September 2010. On New Year's Day 2010, what later proved to be a demo version of "Free Me" became available for free download on Jenny's official website as a teaser of her upcoming solo material.

In May 2010, the first official single, "Here I Am" was released throughout Europe. "Here I Am" entered and peaked at number 14 on the Swedish charts. "Gotta Go" was released as the album's second single in September 2010 preceding the album's release in October 2010. The album was released worldwide through various music outlets, including iTunes. The album includes a new, remixed version of "Free Me", as well as a studio version of fan favorite "Give Me The Faith," a song Jenny had begun to sing at live appearances a decade earlier.

Track listing

Charts

Release history

References

Jenny Berggren albums
2010 debut albums